Jun Jae-Youn or Jeon Jae-Yeon (born 9 February 1983) is a South Korean badminton player. Born in Pocheon, Jun was part of the Korea National Sport University. She was the champion at the 2004 Asian Championships in the women's singles event. She played badminton at the 2004 Summer Olympics for South Korea, defeating Charmaine Reid of Canada in the first round but losing to Cheng Shao-chieh of Chinese Taipei in the round of 16. At the 2005 Swiss Open, she was suffered a rupture of the knee cruciate ligament injury at the match against Xu Huaiwen of Germany in the quarter-finals round. Jun also competed at the Olympic Games for the second time at the 2008 Beijing and reach in to the third round. She beat Kamila Augustyn and Chloe Magee in the first and two rounds, but was defeated by Zhang Ning in the straight games.

Achievements

Asian Championships 
Women's singles

Asian Junior Championships 
Girls' singles

BWF Grand Prix 
The BWF Grand Prix has two level such as Grand Prix and Grand Prix Gold. It is a series of badminton tournaments, sanctioned by Badminton World Federation (BWF) since 2007. The World Badminton Grand Prix sanctioned by International Badminton Federation (IBF) since 1983.

Women's singles

 BWF Grand Prix Gold tournament
 BWF & IBF Grand Prix tournament

BWF International Challenge/Series/Satellite
Women's singles

 BWF International Challenge tournament
 BWF International Series tournament

References

External links 

 Korean Olympic Committee Athlete Profile (in Korean)
 
 

South Korean female badminton players
1983 births
Living people
People from Pocheon
Badminton players at the 2004 Summer Olympics
Badminton players at the 2008 Summer Olympics
Olympic badminton players of South Korea
Asian Games medalists in badminton
Badminton players at the 2006 Asian Games
Badminton players at the 2002 Asian Games
Asian Games silver medalists for South Korea
Asian Games bronze medalists for South Korea
Medalists at the 2002 Asian Games
Medalists at the 2006 Asian Games
Sportspeople from Gyeonggi Province
21st-century South Korean women
20th-century South Korean women